The 8th Rifle Division was a military formation of the Soviet Union's Red Army in the Winter War, the Soviet invasion of Poland, and World War II. It was formed three times.

First Formation 1918–1941
The division was formed by an order of the Moscow Military District and was based on the 5th Moscow Infantry Division, 1st Infantry Division in Tula, 2nd Infantry Division in Tambov and the 5th Infantry Division in Kaluga.

In September 1918 it was named the 8th Infantry Division. On 11 October 1918, it was renamed the 8th Rifle Division. The division received a number of awards between the 1920s and 1930s. On 8 December 1921 it was given the name "Minsk." On 29 February 1928 it was awarded the Honorary Revolutionary Red Banner on the 10th anniversary of the Red Army.

On 26 July 1926 it was named "Dzerzhinsky," and in 1932 was awarded the Order of the Red Banner of Labour. A reference to being 'formed at Semipalatinsk prior to 1936' in Poirer and Connor's Red Army Order of Battle remains unconfirmed by Russian sources. The formation's full title appears to have become the 8th Minsk Red Banner Order of Red Banner of Labor Dzerzhinsky Rifle Division.

Brigade Commander Vladimir Kolpakchi took command of the unit in 1933. The division took part in the Invasion of Poland as part of the 16th Rifle Corps, 11th Army. Brigade Commander Ivan Fursin held command from December 1938 to 4 February 1940. On 22 January 1940, it was part of the 13th Rifle Corps of the Northwestern Front during the Winter War, but had been shifted to the 23rd Rifle Corps by 31 January 1940. On 5 February 1940 Brigade Commander Fyodor Dmitrievich Rubtsov took command. On 8 March 1940 it was part of the Northwestern Front's 15th Rifle Corps. On 27 April 1940 Colonel Nikolay Fomin took command from Rubtsov. On 22 June 1941, it was part of the 1st Rifle Corps, 10th Army, itself part of the Western Front.

Major components at the beginning of Operation Barbarossa included the 151st, 229th, and 310th Rifle Regiments, the 62nd Light Artillery Regiment, the 117th Howitzer Artillery Regiment, and the 2nd Reconnaissance Company. During the Second World War it was part of the 'Operational Army' from 22 June 1941 to 4 July 1941.

The division was stationed at Łomża. In accordance with the Western Special Military District covering plan, the division was to take up positions in the Osovetsky Fortified Region and along the 1939 state border with German-occupied Poland in the areas of Shchuchin, Brzozowo, Ptak, and Servatki.

On the first day of the war the Division HQ came under aerial bombardment. On 23 June 1941 the Division held the front in the Ščučyn region as well. On 25 June 1941 the division conduct a withdrawal while the Białystok and, because the prisoners were rounded up. On 27 June 1941, at the headquarters of the front had no information not only about the division, but also on 10th Army, which included the division.

By 1 July 1941 the division was still part of 1st Rifle Corps, but 1st Rifle Corps had been diverted directly to the Western Front. In early July, the division was destroyed in the Białystok area, as part of the German encirclement west of Minsk but unorganized resistance continued until the end of July. The division was officially disbanded on 19 September 1941.

Second Formation 1941
The division was ordered to reform in 1941. On 2 July 1941 the division reformed in the Krasnopresnensky District of Moscow, as the 8th Krasnopresnenskaya Peoples' Militia Rifle Division under the command of the Moscow Military District. The division contained an unusually large number of writers, musicians and historians; the writers were put together in the 3rd Company of the 1st Battalion of the 24th Rifle Regiment, which became known as the "Writers' Company". By 10 July 1941, the regiments of the division had moved to the forest near Nicholas Urupino and Buzlanova. In late July, the division engaged in the fortification of defensive lines on the Mozhaysk line of defense. From at least 1 August 1941 to its destruction, the division was part of the 32nd Army, itself part of the Reserve Front. 
On 4 August 1941 the division took positions on the Rzhev-Vyazma line of defence, and from 30 August 1941, in positions on the eastern shore of the Dnieper River as well. On 24 August 1941 the formation was formally renamed the 8th Rifle Division. It included the 22nd, 23rd, and 24th Rifle Regiments. In October, in connection with the beginning of the German Operation Typhoon it moved to the east of Yelnya.
The division entered combat on 4 October 1941, the next day, 5 October 1941, losing more than half of its personnel. On 6 October 1941 it was cut off from the main organs of the regiments. Some of the division's surviving fighters were able to join partisan units. While the division was effectively destroyed on 6–7 October 1941 it was not formally disbanded until 30 November 1941.

Third Formation
The Third Formation of the 8th Rifle Division traces its origins to the 458th Rifle Division, which was formed in Semipalatinsk and Ayaguz in the Central Asian Military District on 25 December 1941. In early 1942 it was redesignated as the 8th Rifle Division. Its rifle regiments, using the same numbers as the first formation, were the 151st, 229th, and 310th. Its full name became the 8th Yampol Red Banner Order of Suvorov Rifle Division, after winning the honorific Yampol.
On 1 April 1942 the division was part of the Stavka Reserve. By 1 July 1942 it had been assigned to the Bryansk Front's 42nd Army. By 1 October it was part of 13th Army, and stayed assigned to that formation on 1 July 1943 it was assigned to the Soviet Central Front's 13th Army, as part of the 15th Rifle Corps. It participated in the Voronezh-Kastornoye, Eastern Carpathians, and the Prague offensives, the Battle of Kursk, the crossing of the Dnieper and the Desna and Pripyat Rivers. It defended Mtsensk and participated in the liberation of Kromy, Nevel, Novgorod-Seversky, and Chernigov.

Subordination 1944–1945
1st Ukrainian Front, 60th Army, 23rd Rifle Corps – on 1 January 1944
1st Ukrainian Front, 18th Army, 17th Guards Rifle Corps – on 1 July 1944
4th Ukrainian Front (front-line attachment) – to 1 October 1944
4th Ukrainian Front, 16th Army – on 1 January 1945,
4th Ukrainian Front, 18th Army, 17th Guards Rifle Corps – on 1 April 1945

The division was part of the 18th Army of the 4th Ukrainian Front in May 1945. The 8th Division was ordered disbanded on 29 May by the order that formed the Northern Group of Forces, with its troops used to reinforce the units of the group.

References

Citations

Bibliography 
 
 Goff, James F. "The mysterious high‐numbered Red Army rifle divisions." The Journal of Slavic Military Studies 11, no. 4 (1998): 195–202.

External links
Directory
Samsv.narod.ru on 8th Rifle Division
Operational summary of Staff of the Western Front 
Memoirs Chief 4-th branch management division headquarters on the first days of war

008
Military units and formations established in 1918
Military units and formations disestablished in 1957
1918 establishments in Russia
Wikipedia articles needing cleanup after translation from Russian
Military units and formations of the Soviet invasion of Poland
Military units and formations of the Soviet Union in the Winter War
Military units and formations awarded the Order of the Red Banner